Andrej Štrba (born 28 February 1998) is a Slovak professional footballer who currently plays for Fortuna Liga club FK Pohronie.

Club career

FK Pohronie
Štrba's arrival in Pohronie was announced on 4 January 2021 on the club's official website. It was his third career stop in senior football after Inter Bratislava and Tatran Liptovský Mikuláš, as well as his first top division club.

Štrba made his Fortuna Liga debut in a neutral ground fixture against Nitra on 6 February 2021. He appeared in the starting-XI and lasted the entirety of the match. Pohronie took the lead through Adler Da Silva's penalty, but Nitra equalised through Kilian Pagliuca before the half-time. The Žiar nad Hronom-based club regained the lead in the 80th minute, after Štrba scored, converting Ondrej Chvěja's pass after a scuffle, following a corner kick. Da Silva connected the game's last goal, following Fadera's pass in stoppage time, setting the score at 3:1 and gaining Pohronie mere second seasonal victory in the 17th round.

References

External links
 
 Eurofotbal.cz profile
 Futbalnet profile

1998 births
Living people
People from Čadca
Sportspeople from the Žilina Region
Slovak footballers
Slovakia youth international footballers
Association football defenders
FK Inter Bratislava players
MFK Tatran Liptovský Mikuláš players
FK Pohronie players
2. Liga (Slovakia) players
Slovak Super Liga players